Camapuã is a municipality located in the Brazilian state of Mato Grosso do Sul. Its population was 13,693 (2020) and its area is 10,758 km².

References

Municipalities in Mato Grosso do Sul